Harvey is a civil parish in southern Albert County, New Brunswick, Canada. It comprises a single local service district, which is a member of the Southeast Regional Service Commission.

The Census subdivision of the same name shares the parish's borders.

Origin of name
The parish was probably named in honour of Sir John Harvey, Lieutenant Governor of New Brunswick 1837-1841.

History
Harvey Parish was erected in 1838 from western Hopewell and southern Salisbury Parishes. It included modern Alma Parish and the southern part of Elgin Parish.

Boundaries
Harvey Parish is bounded:

on the northwest by a line beginning about 2.8 kilometres west and slightly south of the junction of Rice Road with Kent Road, then running north 72º east to a point about 1.35 kilometres north of Lumsden Road, where Elgin, Harvey, Hillsborough and Hopewell Parishes meet;
on the east by a line running south 22º east to Crooked Creek, then down the creek and Shepody River to Shepody Bay;
on the south by Shepody Bay, Haw Haw Bay, Chignecto Bay, and Rocher Bay;
on the west by a line beginning on Rocher Bay about 1.1 kilometres southwest of the mouth of Alcorn Brook, then running northerly along the western line of a grant to James Speer and its prolongation to the starting point;
including Grindstone Island.

Evolution of boundaries
Harvey's northern line was originally an extension of the northern line of Hopewell Parish, running north of Church Hill Road. This put Church Hill, Churches Corner, Ferndale, River View, and Ross Corner in Harvey.

Following the erection of Albert County in 1845 the new county line passed through Salisbury and Harvey Parishes. This was found inconvenient and the county line was moved in 1846, adding the remainder of modern Elgin Parish to Harvey.

The northern part of Harvey was erected as Elgin Parish in 1847 and the western part as Alma Parish in 1855, giving the parish its modern boundaries.

In 1877 Grindstone Island was omitted from the boundary description of Harvey; this was corrected in 1879.

Local service district
The local service district of the parish of Harvey includes the entire parish. The LSD was established on 23 November 1966 to assess for fire protection following the abolition of county councils in the new Municipalities Act. First aid & ambulance services were added on 21 January 1976.

Today it assesses for community & recreation services in addition to the basic LSD services of fire protection, police services, land use planning, emergency measures, and dog control. The taxing authority is 617.00 Harvey.

Communities
Communities at least partly within the parish. italics indicate a name no longer in official use

  Beaver Brook
 Brookville
 Cape Enrage
 Casey Hill
 Derrys Corner
 Germantown
  Harvey
 Harvey Bank
  Little Ridge
 Midway
  New Horton
 New Ireland
 Upper New Horton
  Waterside
 West River

Bodies of water
Bodies of water at least partly in the parish.

 North River
 Petitcodiac River
 Shepody River
 West River
 Canada Creek
 Crooked Creek
 Northwest Branch Crooked Creek
 Fairy Creek
 Newfoundland Creek
 New Horton Creek
 Two Rivers Creek
 Chignecto Bay
 Haw Haw Bay
 Rocher Bay
 Salisbury Bay
 Shepody Bay
  Lockhart Lake
 McFadden Lake
 New Horton Lake

Islands
Islands at least partly within the parish.
 Grindstone Island
 Toms Island

Other notable places
Parks, historic sites, and other noteworthy places in the parish.
 Caledonia Gorge Protected Natural Area
 Cape Enrage Provincial Park
 Shepody National Wildlife Area

Demographics

Population

Language
Mother tongue (2016)

Access Routes
Highways and numbered routes that run through the parish, including external routes that start or finish at the parish limits:

Highways

Principal Routes
None

Secondary Routes:

External Routes:
None

See also
List of parishes in New Brunswick

Notes

References

Parishes of Albert County, New Brunswick
Local service districts of Albert County, New Brunswick